Flabellinopsis iodinea, the Spanish shawl, is a species of aeolid nudibranch, a very colorful sea slug. This is a marine gastropod mollusk in the family Flabellinidae.

Distribution
This species is native to the west coast of North America and farther south. It has been reported as far north as British Columbia, Canada, and as far south as Punta Asunción, Baja California Sur, Mexico. In addition it is found in the Gulf of California and the Galapagos Islands.

It has been found off the coast of Santa Catalina Island, California.
It has also been found off the coast of the Palos Verdes Peninsula and San Diego, California .

Description
This nudibranch displays a stunning set of colors: the body is purple, the cerata are orange and the rhinophores are scarlet. The neon orange appendages on the back of Flabellinopsis iodinea are the cerata which extract oxygen from the sea water they are surrounded by and live in. The cerata are also extensions of the digestive system, and are used to store the stinging cells of the anemones and fan-like hydroids they eat. The red rhinophores are sensory structures used for detecting the presence of possible mates and prey. The purple, red, and orange colors are derived from a single carotenoid pigment, astaxanthin. The pigment appears in three modified states, leading to the three distinct colors.

Scientists think the reason why the Spanish Shawl's gills are orange is so they can camouflage with their prey while they are eating. The orange gills on their backs are also a warning to potential predators. The color tells their predators that they are either poisonous or distasteful.

Life habits
Spanish shawls are hermaphrodites, which means they have both male and female reproductive organs. However, self-fertilisation very rarely occurs. When threatened by other predators, they can gracefully move away by flexing their body strongly and pushing off from the substrate and into midwater.

Gallery

References

External links
 

Flabellinidae
Western North American coastal fauna
Marine fauna of the Gulf of California
Galápagos Islands coastal fauna
Gastropods described in 1863
Taxa named by James Graham Cooper